Ellerbe Road School is, along with "Satan School," the colloquial name for a defunct school campus located along Ellerbe Road in Caddo Parish, Louisiana, United States. It is alleged to be haunted.

History
George Washington Carver High School opened in 1957. The school consistently struggled with a low population base from which to draw students, more so after desegregation, and the school closed in 1973.

In 1981, Baptist Tabernacle leased the property for use as a campus of Baptist Christian College. The site closed in 1985. The buildings have been unoccupied since that time.

Campus
The campus remains the property of Caddo Parish School Board. The site has been leased for agricultural use (specifically livestock grazing) since at least 1996.

In 2011, The Caddo Parish School Board in a 9–2 vote, with one abstained, approved Vision 20/20, a master facilities plan which will ultimately call for the demolition of the Carver Campus, along with two other abandoned Rodessa schools (Rodessa High and Pine Valley) that closed in 1976.

External links
 Aerial video of Ellerbe Road School campus - June 2016
 Additional video of Ellerbe Road School campus

References

Educational institutions disestablished in 1973
Buildings and structures in Shreveport, Louisiana
Defunct schools in Louisiana
Educational institutions established in 1957
1957 establishments in Louisiana
1973 disestablishments in Louisiana
Historically segregated African-American schools in Louisiana